Ishmaelite may refer to:

 one of the Ishmaelites, descendants of Ishmael in the Bible, later identified with Arabs by Muslim scholars
 an Ismaili, a follower of a branch of Shia Islam
 Sparta Ishmaelite, a newspaper in Sparta, GA